Albert J. Friscia (July 22, 1911 – September 2, 1989), was an Italian American sculptor.  Initially interested in painting, Friscia studied art at the National Academy of Design in New York City in the Black Mountain College with Josef Albers, and in Paris with André Masson, then became Kinetic artist.

Important works
In the United States and in Italy he was commissioned with a number of important works of architectural sculpture, such as:
 The massive bronze doors of Holy Name Cathedral, Chicago;
 A contribution to the altar in St. Peter's Basilica, Rome

See also
 Abstract art
 Kinetic art
 Op art

Bibliography
Albert Friscia of Mantura Bruno – De Luca Editori d’Arte – 2008 – Rome, Italy (in Italian) 

1911 births
1989 deaths
20th-century American sculptors
20th-century American male artists
American male sculptors